Bakary Sanneh (born 18 July 1959) is a Gambian wrestler. He competed at the 1988 Summer Olympics in the men's freestyle 90 kg.

References

1959 births
Living people
Gambian male sport wrestlers
Olympic wrestlers of the Gambia
Wrestlers at the 1988 Summer Olympics
Place of birth missing (living people)